The 1984 USFL Draft was the second collegiate draft of the United States Football League (USFL). It took place on January 4, 1984, at The Roosevelt Hotel in New York. The new six expansion teams were given the first six selections, followed by the established teams' picks, then followed by six additional selections by the expansion teams. In the even numbered rounds, the established teams chose first, followed by the expansion teams.

Player selections

Supplemental draft

References

External links
 1984 USFL Draft
 1984 USFL Draft Pick Transactions

United States Football League drafts
USFL Draft
USFL Draft
1980s in Manhattan
American football in New York City
Sports in Manhattan
Sporting events in New York City
USFL Draft